Stomopteryx bathrarcha is a moth of the family Gelechiidae. It was described by Edward Meyrick in 1921. It is found in Zimbabwe.

The wingspan is 14–16 mm. The forewings are dark fuscous with a faint purplish tinge and with the extreme base pale ochreous, shortly produced along the dorsum. The plical and second discal stigmata are obscurely darker and there is a cloudy ochreous-whitish dot on the costa at three-fourths and one or two whitish scales on the tornus opposite. The hindwings are grey.

References

Moths described in 1921
Stomopteryx
Endemic fauna of Zimbabwe